Mathia Khap is a village in West Champaran district in the Indian state of Bihar.

Demographics
As of 2011 India census, Mathia Khap had a population of 99 in 22 households. Males constitute 56.5% of the population and females 43.4%. Mathia Khap has an average literacy rate of 20.2%, lower than the national average of 74%: male literacy is 65%, and female literacy is 34%. In Mathia Khap, 27.2% of the population is under 6 years of age.

References

Villages in West Champaran district